Kung Fu Killer is a 2008 two-part miniseries that aired on Spike TV The film also includes many eastern Kung Fu talent including Osric Chau. The miniseries alludes to the "Kung Fu" programs of the 1970s that brought David Carradine to fame.

The film was completely shot in China.

Reception
The Kung Fu action site 24 Frames per Second gave the film a poor review, criticizing the script, the "coma inducing" David Carradine, as well as Daryl Hannah's singing ability. Moviefone called it "a rather unfortunate tribute". Beyond Hollywood, however, praises Daryl Hannah, but criticizes the overall film as "boring".

References

External links
 

2008 television films
2008 films
Films shot in China